Yousef bin Ahmad Al-Othaimeen is a Saudi Arabian politician who served as secretary-general of the Organisation of Islamic Cooperation (OIC) from November 2016, when Iyad bin Amin Madani stepped down for health reasons, to 29 November 2020.

Education 
Al-Othaimeen has a bachelor's degree in social studies from King Saud University in Riyadh (1977), a master's in political sociology from Ohio University (1982), and a PhD in political sociology from the American University in Washington DC (1986).

The Muslim 500 Mention 
He is also featured in 2019 The Muslim 500 Publication as one of the most influential Muslims

Posts Held 

.

Activities
In March 2018, Al-Othaimeen met with the Pope to discuss the migration crisis and the plight of the Rohingya.

On 25 February 2019, he said that the OIC Council of Foreign Ministers considered the actions perpetrated against Azerbaijani civilians in the 1992 Khojaly Massacre as war crimes, crimes against humanity and genocide.

References

21st-century Saudi Arabian politicians
American University alumni
Government ministers of Saudi Arabia
Living people
King Saud University alumni
Ohio University alumni
Organisation of Islamic Cooperation officials
Year of birth missing (living people)